The 200 Squadron of the Israeli Air Force, also known as the UAV Squadron, is an IAI Heron squadron based at Palmachim Airbase.

References

Israeli Air Force squadrons